Frullania nisquallensis, commonly known as hanging millipede liverwort, is a reddish-brown species of liverwort in the family Frullaniaceae. It is found in western Washington and British Columbia, including Vancouver Island. The plant grows in mats, sometimes in mats that hang from tree branches (particularly those of alders, or maples), or growing close to the substrate. The leaves are small (1 mm long) and flat, with the lower leaves being slightly smaller than those growing farther up the stem.

Secondary metabolites
This species contains the tridepside compound tenuiron, and the sesquiterpenes (-)-frullanolide and costunolide, the latter of which has been shown to be damaging to DNA.

References

Frullaniaceae